The Vadem Clio is a handheld PC that was released in 1999. Models of it used Windows CE H/PC Pro 3.0 (WinCE Core OS 2.11) as the operating system. Data Evolution Corporation currently owns the rights to the Clio.

Overview
The Clio is a convertible tablet computer, designed by Vadem Corporation, which runs Microsoft’s Windows CE operating system and has a "SwingTop" pivoting arm. The 180-degree screen rotation allowed the unit to be used as a touch screen tablet or as a more traditional notebook with keyboard. Clio could run more than 12 hours on a single charge and along with the Sony VAIO, was one of the first full-sized portable computers that measured only an inch (2.2cm) thick.

The platform was conceived of and created within Vadem by a skunkworks team that was led by Edmond Ku. Clio was first developed without the knowledge of Microsoft and after it was presented to Bill Gates and the CE team, led to the definition of the Jupiter class CE platform.

Handwriting software was from Vadem's ParaGraph group (acquired from SGI), the same team which provided handwriting recognition technology used in the Apple Newton.

Originally introduced in 1998, the Clio product line won numerous awards and accolades, such as Mobile Computing & Communications’ “Best Handheld Design, Keyboard Form Factor;” PC Week “Best of Comdex” finalist; Home Office Computing’s Silver Award; Mobility Award “Notebook Computing, PC Companion” winner; Industrial Designs Excellence Awards (IDEA)—Silver in Business and Industrial Equipment; and IDC’s “Best Design”. In addition, the Clio has been featured in hundreds of articles and has appeared on the cover of a number of magazines, including Pen Computing and Business Week.

Design
The swing arm and rotating screen concept was conceived of by Edmond Ku, Vadem's engineering director. The physical design was the creation of frogdesign, Inc.'s industrial designers Sonia Schieffer and Josh Morenstein and mechanical engineers Richard Huang and Jenny Schlee.

The enclosure was made from plastic injection molded carbon fiber reinforced polyamide (nylon). The swing-arm was die-cast aluminium for stiffness and strength. The video signals relied upon a double-sided flex-circuit which routed from the base up through the arm to the display panel.

Specifications

C-1000
Processor: NEC VR4111 (MIPS R4000-compatible) @ 84 MHz
ROM: 24 MiB (upgradable)
SDRAM: 16 MiB (upgradable to 32)
Display: 9.4" 640 × 480 DSTN, 256 colors, touch panel
Software screen Rotation: None
Contrast and Brightness Settings: Yes
Keyboard: 63 Key, US English—16.5 mm center-to-center
Battery: 12-hour lithium ion rechargeable battery pack
Power Supply: 120 volt
Ports:
1 × RS-232 serial port (Not built-in, available on travel dock only)
1 × Type II PC Card
1 × Type II Compact Flash (internal)
Modem: 33.6 kbit/s Lucent
IrDA support: SIR and FIR
Speaker
Microphone
Size/Physical Dimensions: 8.75 in × 11.25 in × 1 in
Weight: 3 lb., 5 oz. (Includes batteries and AC adapter)

C-1050
Processor: NEC VR4121 (MIPS R4000-compatible) @ 168 MHz
ROM: 24 MiB (upgradable)
SDRAM: 32 MiB
Display: 9.4" 640 × 480 DSTN, 65,000 colors, touch panel
Screen Rotation: 0–180° (90° and 270° screen orientation supported)
Contrast and Brightness Settings: Yes
Keyboard: 63 Key, US English—16.5 mm center-to-center
Battery: 10 hour lithium ion rechargeable battery pack
Power Supply: 120 volt
Ports:
1 × RS-232 serial port (Not built-in, available on travel dock only)
1 × Type II PC Card
1 × Type II Compact Flash (internal)
Modem: 56 kbit/s V.90 Lucent
IrDA support: SIR and FIR
Speaker
Microphone
Size/Physical Dimensions: 8.75 in × 11.25 in × 1 in
Weight: 3 lb., 5 oz. (Includes batteries and AC adapter)

See also 
ActiveSync
Personal digital assistant
SuperWaba

References

External links
Vadem, Ltd.
Technical Support
Data Evolution Corp.
Review of the Vadem Clio
Warner's Mips based PDA info Center
NetBSD/hpcmips Project Page
LinuxMIPS Wiki
Linux-VR Project

MIPS architecture
Windows CE devices